The Couze is a  tributary of the Dordogne in France, with its source between Fongalop and Bouillac, and its mouth in Port-de-Couze. The lower half of the stream runs between limestone cliffs. The main villages along the river and its small tributaries are Beaumont-du-Périgord, Montferrand-du-Périgord, Couze-et-Saint-Front and Saint-Avit-Sénieur.

Alongside the river many Paleolithic sites have been found, including the important sites of La Gravette which gave its name to the Gravettian, a major European prehistoric culture which lasted from more than 10,000 years between circa 33,000 BP and 21,000 BP; and Combe-Capelle. Remains from the Neolithic and later periods are more sparse, until habitation again increased in the Middle Ages.

Paleolithic sites
The first archaeological excavations started in the late 19th century, and intensified between 1900 and 1914. The main archaeologist working here was Denis Peyrony from Les Eyzies.
La Gravette, eponymous site for the Gravettian culture, discovered in 1880
Combe-Capelle, where in 1909 a skull was found which was thought to be 30,000 years old. Later research revised the date to 7,000 years old.
La Cavaille, cave with a few engravings from the Périgordian period, discovered in 1934
Les Jean-Blancs, where an engraving of a female figure dating to the Upper Magdalenian was found
Termo-Pialat, discovered in 1911, where some engraved blocks were found

Medieval sites
The large church of Saint-Avit-Sénieur, located on the Camino de Santiago coming from Vézelay

Notes

Rivers of France
Rivers of Nouvelle-Aquitaine
Rivers of Dordogne